David Allan Highet  (27 May 1913 – 28 April 1992) was a New Zealand politician. He was an MP from 1966 to 1984, representing the National Party for Remuera, holding the then largest majorities in the House.

Early life and family
Highet was born in Dunedin, the second son of David and Elsie Highet. He attended Otago Boys' High School. Highet's uncle was Harry Highet, the civil engineer who designed the P-class sailing dinghy.

Highet attended the University of Otago, from where he graduated with a BCom.

Highet tried to enlist in the New Zealand Army in World War II, but was declined due to having suffered from tuberculosis in the 1930s. He served in the Home Guard, reaching the rank of captain.

Highet practised as an accountant and businessman, and was active in the establishment of the Wellington division of the National Party.

In the 1950s, Highet was a Wellington City Councillor after winning a 1955 by-election. In 1954, Highet won the National nomination for the  electorate. Highet's opponent, Labour candidate Frank Kitts, went on to win the seat, and later became the longest-serving Mayor of Wellington.

Highet moved to Auckland in the 1950s, becoming the senior partner in Highet and Toomey, an Auckland accounting firm. In 1960 he became general manager of L. J. Fisher and Co., Ltd and in 1962 he succeeded Hugh Watt to become executive director of the Auckland City Development Association.

Highet was first married to Patricia Hoyles, and they had a daughter and a son.

In 1976, Highet married prominent New Zealand artist and television personality Shona McFarlane.

Member of Parliament

Highet was elected to parliament in the 1966 elections as MP for the Auckland electorate of Remuera, succeeding retiring speaker Ronald Algie. He defeated future colleague George Gair for the nomination as National's candidate for the seat.

Highet was appointed to the Cabinet by Prime Minister Jack Marshall in 1971, becoming Minister of Internal Affairs, Minister of Local Government and associate Minister for Health and Social Welfare.

The National Party lost the 1972 elections, and Highet was in opposition until 1975. When Robert Muldoon contested the leadership of the National Party in 1974, Highet was one of two National MPs to support Marshall.

Cabinet Minister
With the National Party winning the 1975 elections, Highet was appointed to Cabinet again, becoming Minister of Internal Affairs, Minister of Local Government, New Zealand's first Minister for the Arts, and Minister for Sport.

Highet was particularly well regarded for his interest in the arts and sport, having been an opera singer and representative sportsman in his youth. Highet founded the National Youth Orchestra, and was a founding Director of the International Festival of the Arts.  During his time as Minister for the Arts, Highet founded the New Zealand Film Commission, the Hillary Commission, and was actively involved in the organisation of the Historic Places Trust, the New Zealand Symphony Orchestra, the Royal New Zealand Ballet, and the Arts Council.

Legislation
In 1976, Highet introduced the Waitangi Day Act 1976, changing the name of the holiday from New Zealand Day back to Waitangi Day.

In 1977, following a petition to the House, Highet introduced God Defend New Zealand, as New Zealand's official national anthem alongside God Save the Queen.

As Minister of Internal Affairs, Highet oversaw the passage of the Citizenship Act 1977, establishing a New Zealand Citizenship as a separate citizenship, and making British citizens legal aliens for the first time. In November 1979 Highet suggested that the design of the Flag of New Zealand should be changed, and sought an artist to design a new flag with a silver fern on the fly. The proposal attracted little support however.

Think Big
In 1977, Highet introduced the expression "Think Big" in a speech to a National Party Conference, as a description of the government's then-ambitious major projects in the energy sector. Highet, as Minister of Racing, named the policy after Melbourne Cup-winning racehorse Think Big.

Highet was considered to be a social liberal, and was among a handful of economically liberal members of Muldoon's cabinet.

1980 Olympic boycott
Highet was Sports Minister when cabinet decided to support the United States-led boycott to the 1980 Summer Olympics in Moscow. Government stepped in and threatened the New Zealand Olympic and Commonwealth Games Organising Committee (NZOCGA) with funding cuts and cancelled leave for competitors who were in the public service. Highet appealed to the athletes to "think beyond [their] own hopes and ambitions ... any athletes who did go to the Olympic Games would be letting New Zealand down".

1981 Springbok Tour
Highet was Minister for Sport during the 1981 Springbok Tour. While Prime Minister Muldoon announced that the New Zealand Government would not intervene to stop the tour going ahead, Highet made public statements indicating that he could use his authority as Internal Affairs Minister, responsible for lotteries funding, to withdraw financial contributions to the New Zealand Rugby Union if the Tour proceeded.

Retirement
Highet suffered grave illness in early 1984, one of the reasons Muldoon called a snap election.  Highet retired from politics at the 1984 elections, at the age of 71. National Party member Doug Graham, who had unsuccessfully challenged Highet for the National Party nomination in 1981, won the selection, and succeeded Highet that year.

In the 1986 New Year Honours, Highet was appointed a Companion of the Queen's Service Order for public services.

References

 All Honourable Men Auckland University Press 

1913 births
1992 deaths
People educated at Otago Boys' High School
Members of the Cabinet of New Zealand
New Zealand National Party MPs
University of Otago alumni
Companions of the Queen's Service Order
Members of the New Zealand House of Representatives
New Zealand MPs for Auckland electorates
New Zealand Symphony Orchestra people
Unsuccessful candidates in the 1954 New Zealand general election
Wellington City Councillors
Politicians from Dunedin
New Zealand military personnel of World War II